Peter Fleming and John McEnroe were the defending champions, but Fleming did not participate this year.  McEnroe partnered Bill Maze, losing in the first round.

Heinz Günthardt and Paul McNamee won the title, defeating Bob Lutz and Stan Smith 6–7, 6–3, 6–2 in the final.

Seeds

  Bob Lutz /  Stan Smith (final)
  Gene Mayer /  Sandy Mayer (first round)
  Brian Gottfried /  Frew McMillan (quarterfinals)
  Wojtek Fibak /  Balázs Taróczy (quarterfinals)

Draw

Draw

References
Draw

Stockholm Open
1980 Grand Prix (tennis)